The 2012–13 Louisville Cardinals men's basketball team represented the University of Louisville during the 2012–13 NCAA Division I men's basketball season, Louisville's 99th season of intercollegiate competition. The Cardinals competed in the Big East Conference and were coached by Rick Pitino in his 12th season as head coach at Louisville. The team played its home games on Denny Crum Court at the KFC Yum! Center. The Cardinals finished the season 35–5, 14–4 in Big East play to earn a share of the Big East regular season championship. 

They won the Big East tournament for the third time in school history and received the conference's automatic bid to the NCAA tournament. The Cardinals earned a trip to the school's fourth Final Four and defeated Michigan to win the NCAA Championship.

All wins and championships from this season were later vacated.

Pre-season

The Cardinals were the consensus No. 2 team in the preseason polls and were picked to win Big East conference by the media and the coaches. They returned five of nine players from the 2012 Final Four team led by senior and Big East Pre-Season Player of the Year Peyton Siva.  They lost senior Mike Marra to a knee injury on the first day of practice.

Departures

Class of 2012 signees

Roster

Regular season

Out of conference

Louisville opened with two exhibition victories and 3 wins at home. They played in the Battle 4 Atlantis tournament where they defeated #13 Missouri by 23 before losing to #5 Duke in the championship game.  Gorgui Dieng suffered a broken wrist in the Missouri game and did not play against Duke. Louisville won the rest of its out of conference slate including victories at Memphis in the Hall of Fame Shootout and victories against in state rivals Western Kentucky and Kentucky. They entered Big East play with a 12–1 record.

Departures

Big East
The Cardinals opened Big East play with four victories, and were voted #1 in both AP and Coaches Polls in week 10.  They then dropped three straight, a 2-point home loss to #6 Syracuse and back to back road losses at Villanova and Georgetown. The Cardinals won 10 of their next 11 with the one loss at Notre Dame in a 5 OT game that is the longest regular season game in Big East history.  They finished the regular season with a 26–5 (14–4) record and claimed a three-way tie with Georgetown and Marquette as Big East Regular Season Champions.

Junior guard Russ Smith was named a Sporting News Third Team All-American. Senior co-captain Peyton Siva was named 2013 American Eagle Outfitters BIG EAST Men's Basketball Scholar-Athlete of the Year.  Junior Gorgui Dieng was named 2013 Big East Defensive Player of the Year.  Smith and Dieng were named to the 2013 All-Big East First team. Siva was named to the All-Big East Third Team.

Postseason

Big East tournament
The Cardinals were the number 2 seed in the tournament and faced Villanova in the quarter finals, defeating them, 74–55. They next defeated number 24 Notre Dame, 69–57, setting up the final Big East tournament championship game against number 19 Syracuse. Louisville was down by 16 in the second half, but rallied to claim their third Big East tournament championship with a 78–61 victory. The Cardinals repeated as tournament champions.

NCAA tournament
Louisville received the number 1 overall seed in the Midwest Region of the NCAA tournament.  They opened the tournament with a 79–48 win over North Carolina A&T, setting the NCAA tournament single-game record for steals with 20. They closed out the opening weekend by defeating Colorado State, 82–56. They defeated Oregon in the regional semi-final, 77–69, to set up a regional final with Duke, whom they had lost to in the season-opening tournament. Before halftime of the game Louisville guard Kevin Ware suffered a compound fracture. The Cardinals rallied together to defeat Duke by 22 (the largest tournament defeat for coach Mike Krzyzewski since the 1990 National Title Game), 85–63.

The Cardinals advanced to their second consecutive Final Four (their 10th) to face Wichita State. The Shockers led most of the game, and were up by as many as 12 with 13 minutes to play. A 20-point performance by Luke Hancock, and two timely three-point shots by walk-on Tim Henderson, kept the Cardinals in the game, which they won, 72–68, to advance to face Michigan in the National Championship.

In its third NCAA Championship game Louisville went down 12 points. The Cardinals rallied behind a 22-point effort by Final Four MOP Luke Hancock, 18 points and 5 assists from senior captain Peyton Siva, and 15 points and 12 rebounds from sophomore Chane Behanan to win, 82–76, giving Louisville basketball its third NCAA Championship and giving coach Rick Pitino his first title at Louisville.

Schedule and results

|-
!colspan=12 style="background:#AD0000; color:#FFFFFF;"|Exhibition

|-
!colspan=12 style="background:#AD0000; color:#FFFFFF;"|Non-conference regular season

|-
!colspan=9 style="background:#AD0000; color:#FFFFFF;;"|Big East regular season

|-
!colspan=12 style="background:#AD0000; color:#FFFFFF;"| Big East tournament

|-
!colspan=12 style="background:#AD0000; color:#FFFFFF;"| NCAA tournament

Rankings

Source:

Awards
Sporting News Third Team All-America
Russ Smith
Capital One Academic All-America
Peyton Siva
American Eagle Outfitters BIG EAST Men's Basketball Scholar-Athlete of the Year
Peyton Siva
Big East Defensive Player of the Year
Gorgui Dieng
NCAA Final Four Most Outstanding Player
Luke Hancock
NCAA Final Four all-tournament team
Chane Behanan
Luke Hancock
Peyton Siva
NCAA (Midwest) Most Outstanding Player
Russ Smith
NCAA Midwest Regional all-tournament team
Russ Smith
Gorgui Dieng
Peyton Siva
Big East tournament Most Outstanding Player
Peyton Siva
Big East Championship All-Tournament Team
Peyton Siva
Russ Smith
First Team All-Big East
Gorgui Dieng
Russ Smith
Third Team All-Big East
Peyton Siva
Frances Pomeroy Naismith Award (top Division I senior 6'0"/1.83 m or shorter)
Peyton Siva
Elite 89 Award (top GPA among upperclass players at Final Four)
Wayne Blackshear
Best Coach/Manager ESPY Award
Rick Pitino

Controversies and scandals

A former Louisville player, Andre McGee, arranged and paid for strippers and prostitutes to perform striptease dances and sexual acts for 17 prospective and former basketball players from 2010 to 2014. On October 3, 2015, the book publisher IBJ Custom Publishing released a book entitled Breaking Cardinal Rules.  Based on revelations provided by the local self-described escort, Katina Powell, the book detailed striptease dances and acts of prostitution that Powell and McGee arranged and organized in Minardi Hall over approximately a four-year period.

During the investigation of the allegations, the university self-imposed a ban on the 2016 NCAA tournament. In June 2017, the NCAA announced that the university would lose four basketball scholarships over the course of four seasons, but there would be no further postseason ban. The NCAA had initially suspended head coach Rick Pitino for five ACC games during the 2017–18 season, but the Louisville athletic association board agreed unanimously to fire Pitino before the season on October 16, 2017.  The NCAA also ordered the university to vacate all wins from 2011 to 2014 (including the 2013 National Championship) that included ineligible players, a decision that the university appealed. On February 20, 2018, the NCAA upheld the decision.

Notable achievements

 Peyton Siva became Louisville's 64th 1000 point scorer in a 64–38 victory over South Florida on January 12, 2013.
 Russ Smith became the 65th 1000 point scorer in a 79–58 victory over DePaul on February 27, 2013.
 Rick Pitino won his 300th game as Louisville's Head Coach in a 67–51 victory over Cincinnati on March 4, 2013.
 Russ Smith broke the Louisville record for most made free throws in a season previous set by Wes Unseld (177) in the 1967–68 season.
 Peyton Siva broke the Louisville record for most steals in a season with 90 steals, passing the 87 steals Russ Smith had in the 2011–12 season.
 Peyton Siva broke the Louisville record for most career steals with 254 steals, when he passed Darrell Griffith's record of 230 steals he had from 1976 to 1980.
 Peyton Siva tied the Big East tournament record for most steals in a game (7) in the semifinal game against Notre Dame.
 Peyton Siva won his second Big East tournament MVP award, becoming only the second player to win this award multiple times (Patrick Ewing)
 Peyton Siva set a Big East tournament career record with 29 steals, breaking the old mark of 28, held by Pittsburgh's Brandin Knight since 2003.
 The team set the NCAA tournament record for steals in a single game with 20 in a second-round game against North Carolina A&T.
 Russ Smith tied the individual NCAA tournament single game record for steals with 8 against North Carolina A&T (tied with – Ty Lawson 2009)
 Set school record with 35 wins during the season passing the 33 wins the 1979–80 and 2004–05 teams had.
 Luke Hancock is the first and only reserve player to be awarded the Final Four MOP Award.

References

External links
 Louisville Cardinals 2012–13 Basketball Guide
2012–13 Louisville stats

Louisville Cardinals Men's Basketball Team, 2012-13
Louisville Cardinals men's basketball seasons
Louisville
NCAA Division I men's basketball tournament Final Four seasons
NCAA Division I men's basketball tournament championship seasons
Louisville Cardinals men's basketball, 2012-13
Louisville Cardinals men's basketball, 2012-13